Outerwear is clothing and accessories worn outdoors, or clothing designed to be worn outside other garments, as opposed to underwear. It can be worn for formal or casual occasions, or as warm clothing during winter.

List of outerwear

Academic gown
Anorak
Apron
Blazer
Cagoule
Cloak
Coat
Duffle coat
Duster
Frock coat
Gilet
Goggle jacket
Greatcoat
Hat
Hoodie
Jacket
Leather jacket
Matchcoat
Mess jacket
Mino (straw cape)
Opera coat
Overcoat
Pea coat
Poncho
Pants
Raincoat
Rain pants
Redingote
Robe
Shawl
Shirt
Shrug
Ski suit
Sleeved blanket
Sport coat
Sunglasses
Sweater
Sweatshirt
Top coat
Touque
Trench coat
Windbreaker

See also
 Fashion accessory, including outerwear items such as hats, gloves, and scarves

 
Clothing by function
Clothing-related lists